Erik Brännström (born 2 September 1999) is a Swedish professional ice hockey defenceman for the  Ottawa Senators of the National Hockey League (NHL). Brännström was selected 15th overall by the Vegas Golden Knights in the 2017 NHL Entry Draft, and was traded to Ottawa in 2019.

Playing career
Brännström played junior hockey with Swedish team HV71. In 2013–14, he debuted at the under-16 level, playing twenty-three games in the J16 SM. The following season Brännström moved on to HV71's J20 SuperElit. In 2015–16, Brännström made his Swedish Hockey League debut.

He was drafted 15th overall in the 2017 NHL Entry Draft by the Vegas Golden Knights and agreed to a three-year, entry-level contract with the Knights on 16 July 2017. He played the 2017–18 season with the HV71 organization. Brännström earned his first NHL recall on 5 May 2018 to help the Knights during their 2018 Stanley Cup playoffs run, but did not appear in any games.

Brännström attended the Golden Knights 2018 training camp but was reassigned to the American Hockey League (AHL) on 27 September 2018. During the 2018–19 season, Brännström was selected to participate in the 2019 AHL All-Star Game.

On 25 February 2019, Brännström was traded to the Ottawa Senators as part of a package to acquire Mark Stone and Tobias Lindberg. In addition to Brännström, Ottawa acquired Oscar Lindberg and a 2020 second round draft pick in the deal. After the trade, Brännström was assigned to Ottawa's AHL team, the Belleville Senators. He was recalled from the AHL and made his NHL debut with Ottawa on 14 March 2019 in a game against the St. Louis Blues. He was then returned to Belleville following the game. He opened the 2019–20 season with the Senators, but struggled at the NHL level and was sent down to Belleville on 5 December 2019. He was recalled only 11 days later on 16 December after playing in four games with Belleville, collecting one goal and four points. Brännström was returned to Belleville on 3 January 2020. At the end of February, he suffered a wrist injury with Belleville that caused him to miss some games.

On 5 October 2020, Brännström was loaned to the SCL Tigers of the National League (NL) for the start of the 2020–21 season. He made his NL debut with the Tigers on 15 October 2020 in a 8–1 away loss to Genève-Servette HC. On 21 November 2020, in his eighth game with the Tigers, Brännström was punched in the face by EHC Biel's Damien Brunner during a line change in the third period. Brännström was not injured on the play and Brunner immediately received a game misconduct. On 11 December 2020, Brännström left the Tigers after having appeared in 10 games (8 points) to return to Ottawa for the start of training camp. The 2020–21 NHL season was abbreviated due to the COVID-19 pandemic and the season did not begin until January 2021. Brännström did not make the Ottawa Senators out of training camp and was assigned to Belleville on 13 January. He was recalled on 4 February 2021 and placed on the taxi squad. He played his first game of the season versus the Montreal Canadiens, playing on the second power play unit. He scored his first NHL goal on 24 February 2021 versus the Montreal Canadiens. On 5 May 2021, he had three assists in a 5–1 win over Montreal, marking his first multi-point game. Brännström finished the season with two goals and thirteen points in thirty games with the Senators. 

Brännström began the 2021–22 season in Belleville. He was recalled on 7 November 2021 after Nick Holden was placed in COVID-19 protocol. On 13 November, he broke his hand blocking a shot in a game versus the Los Angeles Kings. He returned to the lineup on 1 January 2022. He finished the season with 14 points in 53 games with Ottawa. On 5 September 2022, Brännström signed a one year, $900,000 contract extension with the Ottawa Senators.

Personal life
Brännström's older brother Isac, is also a professional hockey player, currently with Luleå HF.

Career statistics

Regular season and playoffs

International

Awards and honors

References

External links

1999 births
Living people
Belleville Senators players
Chicago Wolves players
HV71 players
National Hockey League first-round draft picks
Ottawa Senators players
People from Eksjö Municipality
SCL Tigers players
Swedish ice hockey defencemen
Vegas Golden Knights draft picks
Sportspeople from Jönköping County